The following is a list of Philippine television shows currently in production, organized in order of first year of broadcast. There is also a list of Philippine television programs by date, which lists shows based on their month and day of first broadcast.

A list of years in television, not limited to the Philippines, is also available.

1960s
 The News with Uncle Bob (1961–1972)
 Big News (1962–1972, 1992–2008)
 Pangunahing Balita (1962–1972, 1987–1998)
 Top 5 Update (1962–1972)
 Dancetime with Chito (1962–1972)
 Oras ng Ligaya (1962–1968)
 Family Kuarta o Kahon (1962–2000)
 Hiwaga sa Bahay na Bato (1963–1964)
 Buhay Artista (1964–1972)
 An Evening with Pilita (1965–1972, 1994–1995)
 The World Tonight (1966–1972, 1986–present)
 9-Teeners (1966–1969)
 Tang-Tarang-Tang (1966–1972)
 Gorio and His Jeepney (1966–1968)
 Balita Ngayon (1967–1972, 1986–1987)
 Everyday Holiday (1968–1970)
 Boarding House (1969–1972)
 Super Laff-In (1969–1972, 1996–1999)

1970s
 NewsWatch (1970–2012)
 Ariel Con Tina (1972–1974)
 John en Marsha (1973–1990)
 Seeing Stars with Joe Quirino (1973–1986)
 Ginang Milyonarya (1973–1975)
 Nagmamahal, Amalia (1973–1975)
 Ariel & Co After Six (1974–1978)
 Jukebox Jamboree (1974–1976)
 Jesus Miracle Crusade (1975–present)
 PBA on KBS (1975, 1977)
 Kapwa Ko Mahal Ko (1975–present)
 Apat na Sikat (1975–1981)
 PBA on BBC (1976)
 GMA News Digest (1976–1987)
 PBA on MBS (1978–1981)
 GMA Supershow (1978–1997)
 Eat Bulaga! (1979–present)
 Chicks to Chicks (1979–1991)

1980s
 Anna Liza (1980–1985)
 Lovingly Yours, Helen (1980–1986)
 Ating Alamin (1980–2016)
 See-True (1980–1987)
 Nang Dahil sa Pag-Ibig (1981–1982)
 PBA on Vintage Sports (1982–1999)
 RPN NewsBreak (1982–1989, 1994–2003)
 The Penthouse Live! (1982–1987)
 The 11:30 Report (1982–1986)
 Ang Iglesia ni Cristo (1983–present)
 Yagit (1983–1985)
 Ang Dating Daan (1983–present)
 Coney Reyes on Camera (1984–1998)
 Heredero (1984–1987)
 Amorsola (1985–1987)
 That's Entertainment (1986–1996)
 Mirasol del Cielo (1986–1987)
 Goin' Bananas (1986–1991)
 Heartbeat (1986–1987)
 GMA Balita (1986–1998)
 GMA Headline News (1986–1992)
 GMA Saturday/Sunday Report (1986–1989)
 Lunch Date (1986–1993)
 Balita sa IBC (1986–1989)
 Balita sa IBC Huling Ulat (1986–1989)
 Vilma (1986–1995)
 Andrea Amor (1986–1987)
 The Sharon Cuneta Show (1986–1997)
 Magandang Umaga Po (1986–1996)
 ABS-CBN News Advisory (1986–2005)
 Nestle Special (1986–1987)
 Luneta: Discovery Hour (1986)
 Hilakbot (1986)
 Ina (1986)
 Mommy Ko, Daddy Ko! (1986–1987)
 Napakasakit, Kuya Eddie (1986–1988)
 Nine-Teeners (1986–1987)
 PEP (People, Events and Places) Talk (1986–1990)
 Travel Time (1986–2015)
 Jesus the Healer (1986–present)
 PTV Special Coverage (1986–2001, 2011–present)
 Penpen de Sarapen (1987–2001)
 Sic O'Clock News (1987–1990)
 GMA News Live (1987–2002)
 Movie Magazine (1987–1995)
 TV Patrol (1987–present)
 Palibhasa Lalake (1987–1998)
 Loveliness (1987–1990)
 Probe (1987–2010)
 Family Rosary Crusade (1987–2018)
 Martin and Pops Twogether (1987–1988)
 Dance-2-Nite (1987–1988)
 Afternoon Delight (1987–1989)
 Mother Studio Presents (1987–1996)
 Agila (1987–1992)
 News on 4 (1987–1995)
 Maricel Regal Drama Special (1987–1989)
 Okay Ka, Fairy Ko! (1987–1997)
 Katalog sa Trese (1987–1988)
 Chika Chika Chicks (1987–1991)
 The Message (1987–2003, 2012–present)
 Cinemascoop (1988)
 Eye to Eye (1988–1996)
 Dance Tonight (1988)
 Tonight with Dick and Carmi (1988–1991)
 Ipaglaban Mo! (1988–present)
 Martin After Dark (1988–1998)
 Magandang Gabi... Bayan (1988–2005)
 PTV Newsbreak (1989–1998, 2012–2020)
 The Maricel Drama Special (1989–1997)
 Mel & Jay (1989–1996)
 The Hour Updates (1989–1994)
 Anna Luna (1989–1995)
 Bantay Balita (1989–1990)
 Headline Trese (1989–1992, 1997–1998)
 Sa Linggo nAPO Sila (1989–1995)
 Del Monte Kitchenomics (1989–2020)

1990s
 Junior Patrol (1990–1992)
 Business Today (1990–1996)
 Mongolian Barbecue (1990–1994)
 Buddy en Sol (1990–1995)
 Malacañang Press Conference (1990–present)
 Friends Again (1990–2020)
 Teysi ng Tahanan (1991–1997)
 Abangan Ang Susunod Na Kabanata (1991–1997)
 Kape at Balita (1991–1993, 2012–2013)
 Islands Newsbreak (1991–1992)
 Maalaala Mo Kaya (1991–present)
 GMA Network News (1992–2002)
 Valiente (1992–1997)
 Firing Line (1992–1999)
 Balitang Balita (1992–2004)
 Live on 5 (1992–2004)
 Entertainment Today (1992–1999)
 The Big Night (1992–2004)
 ABCinema (1992–1998, 2004–2008)
 IBC NewsBreak (1992–1994, 2014–2018)
 IBC News 11 O'Clock Report (1992–1995)
 IBC News 5:30 Report (1992–1995)
 GMA's Best (1992–2002)
 5 and Up (1992–2003)
 Battle of the Brains (1992–2001)
 Showbiz Lingo (1992–1999)
 Mara Clara (1992–1997)
 Ober Da Bakod (1992–1997)
 Gwapings Live! (1992–1993)
 Ang TV (1992–1997)
 Home Along Da Riles (1999–2003)
 El Shaddai (1992–2020)
 Legal Forum (1992–2018)
 The Police Hour (1992–2007)
 Star Drama Presents (1993–2001)
 SST: Salo-Salo Together (1993–1995)
 Haybol Rambol (1993–1995)
 Kate en Boogie (1993–1994)
 Oki Doki Doc (1993–2000)
 Brigada Siete (1993–2001)
 Oras ng Katotohanan (1993–2018)
 Mag-Agri Tayo (1993–present)
 Thank God It's RJ (1993–present)
 Tropang Trumpo (1994–1999)
 IBC Headliners (1994–2011)
 Mixed N.U.T.S. (Numero Unong Terrific Show!) (1994–1997)
 ATBP: Awit, Titik at Bilang na Pambata (1994–1997)
 Sine'skwela (1994–2004)
 Show & Tell (1994–1995)
 Citiline (1994–1999)
 The 700 Club Asia (1994–present)
 'Sang Linggo nAPO Sila (1995–1998)
 Cristy Per Minute (1995–1999, 2011–present)
 Inside Showbiz (1995–1997)
 Dong Puno Live (1995–2000, 2003–2005)
 ASAP (1995–present)
 PCSO Lottery Draw (1995–present)
 Familia Zaragoza (1995–1996)
 Batang X sa TV (1995–1996)
 CTN Midnite (1995–1998)
 IBC TV X-Press (1995–1997)
 Kadenang Kristal (1995–1996)
 Katok Mga Misis (1995–1998)
 T.G.I.S. (1995–1999)
 Citynet Television News (1995–1999)
 Saksi (1995–present)
 PTV News (1995–1998, 2016–2020)
 Emergency (1995–2009)
 Startalk (1995–2015)
 Bubble Gang (1995–present)
 Villa Quintana (1995–1997)
 Calvento Files (1995–1998)
 Usapang Business (1996–2002)
 Lyra (1996–1997)
 Tierra Sangre (1996–1999)
 Friday Box Office (1996–2004)
 Saturday Night Blockbusters (1996–1999, 2006–2008)
 Mukha ng Buhay (1996–1999)
 The Kris Aquino Show (1996)
 Partners Mel and Jay (1996–2004)
 D.A.T.S. (1996)
 Super Games (1996–1997)
 Eezy Dancing (1996–2002)
 Wow Mali (1996–2008, 2009–2015)
 ABS-CBN Weekend News (1996–2005)
 Alas Singko Y Medya (1996–2002)
 Gimik (1996–1999)
 Balitang K (1996–2001)
 Dateline Philippines (1996–present)
 Mia Gracia (1996–1997)
 ETChing: Entertainment Today with Lyn Ching (1996–1998)
 SNBO: Sunday Night Box Office (1996–2020)
 News 23 (1996–1998)
 Anna Karenina (1996–2002)
 Ms. D! (1996–1999)
 Flames (1996–2002)
 Today with Kris Aquino (1996–2001)
 GoBingo (1996–1999, 2008)
 Isumbong Mo Kay Tulfo (1996–2006, 2021–present)
 SOP (1997–2010)
 Walang Tulugan with the Master Showman (1997–2016)
 Esperanza (1997–1999)
 Mula sa Puso (1997–1999)
 Ikaw na Sana (1997–1998)
 Good Morning Asia (1997–1998)
 1 for 3 (1997–2001)
 Kaya ni Mister, Kaya ni Misis (1997–2001)
 Growing Up (1997–1999)
 Wansapanataym (1997–2005, 2010–2019)
 !Oka Tokat (1997–2002)
 Pira-pirasong Pangarap (1997–2003)
 Del Tierro (1997–1999)
 Pinoy Blockbusters (1998–2002)
 Sing Galing! (1998–2005)
 Mornings @ GMA (1998–1999)
 Ganyan Kita Kamahal (1998)
 S-Files (1998–2007)
 Brunch with Bing & Michelle (1998–1999)
 Kasangga Mo ang Langit (1998–present)
 IBC Express Balita (1998–2011)
 IBC Balita Ngayon (1998–2000)
 Halik sa Apoy (1998–1999)
 Diyos at Bayan (1998–present)
 Knowledge Power (1998–2004)
 Sharon (1998–2004, 2006–2010)
 News Central (1998–2010)
 Global News (1998–2003)
 Kool Ka Lang (1998–2003)
 Tukaan (1998–present)
 Pambansang Balita Ala-Una (1998–2001)
 Pambansang Balita Ala-Sais (1998–2001)
 National Network News (1998–2001)
 Sa Sandaling Kailangan Mo Ako (1998–1999)
 The Correspondents (1998–2010)
 Debate with Mare at Pare (1998–2006)
 Richard Love Lucy (1998–2001)
 Maynila (1998–2020)
 Martin Late at Nite (1998–2003)
 MTB (1998–2005)
 i-Witness (1999–present)
 Marinella (1999–2001)
 Cheche Lazaro Presents (1999–2003, 2010–2014)
 G-mik (1999–2002)
 Ang Munting Paraiso (1999–2002)
 Tarajing Potpot (1999–2000)
 Beh Bote Nga (1999–2003)
 Mikee Forever (1999)
 Tabing Ilog (1999–2003)
 Breakfast (1999–2007)
 Ispup (1999–2004)
 Saan Ka Man Naroroon (1999–2001)
 F! (1999–2006)
 Di Ba't Ikaw (1999)
 The Buzz (1999–2015)
 Alas Dose sa Trese (1999–2000)
 Labs Ko Si Babe (1999–2000) 
 Kirara, Ano ang Kulay ng Pag-ibig? (1999–2001)
 Pulso: Aksyon Balita (1999–2000)
 Frontpage: Ulat ni Mel Tiangco (1999–2004)
 Pintados (1999–2000)
 Pwedeng Pwede (1999–2001)
 Judy Ann Drama Special (1999–2001)
 ANC Headlines (1999–present)
 Click (1999–2004)
 Unang Hirit (1999–present)
 Pasugo: Ang Tinig ng Iglesia ni Cristo (1999–2004, 2008–present)
 PJM Forum (1999–present)
 The Iglesia Ni Cristo and the Bible (1999–2003, 2008–present)
 Gabay sa Mabuting Asal (1999–2003, 2012–present)
 Epol/Apple (1999–2004)

2000s

2000–2004 
 ABS-CBN Headlines (2000–2003)
 ABS-CBN Insider (2003–2006)
 Idol Ko si Kap (2000–2005)
 Imbestigador (2000–present)
 Convergence (2000–2016)
 Lakbayin Ang Magandang Pilipinas (2000–present)
 Auto Review (2001–present)
 Daddy Di Do Du (2001–2007)
 Family Feud (2001–2017)
 SiS (2001–2010)
 The Price Is Right (2001–2003)
 Liwanagin Natin (2001–2007,  2014–present)
 Prayer for the Holy Souls in Purgatory (2002–2014)
 Rod Nazario's In This Corner (2001–2015)
 Ang Tamang Daan (2001–present)
 Teledyaryo (2001–2012)
 All-Star K! (2002–2009)
 Bitag (2002–present)
 IBC News Tonight (2002–2011)
 OK Fine, 'To Ang Gusto Nyo! (2002–2006)
 Talitha Kum Healing Mass (2002–2019)
 Magpakailanman (2002–2008,  2012–present)
 Wish Ko Lang (2002–present)
 Flash Report (2002–2016)
 Upon This Rock by the Cathedral of the King (2002–2015)
 RJ Sunday Jam (2003–present)
 Nuts Entertainment (2003–2008)
 Daisy Siete (2003–2010)
 Iglesia Ni Cristo Chronicles (2003–present)
 Give Us This Day (2003–present)
 Healing Mass: Mass for the Homebound with Fr. Mario Sobrejuanite (2003–present)
 Art Angel (2004–2011)
 Bitoy's Funniest Videos (2004–2009)
 Itanong mo Kay Soriano: Ang Dating Daan Worldwide Bible Exposition (2004–present)
 Ito Ang Balita (2004–present)
 Rated K (2004–2020) 
 Mel and Joey (2004–2011)
 Reporter's Notebook (2004–present)
 Home Shopping Network (2003–2015)
 24 Oras (2004–present)
 Kapuso Mo, Jessica Soho (2004–present)
 Make My Day with Larry Henares (2004–present)
 Sentro (2004–2008)
 Truth in Focus (2004–present)
 The KNC (Kawan ng Cordero) Show (2004–present)
 D'X-Man (2004–present)
 The Gospel of the Kingdom with Pastor Apollo C. Quiboloy (2004-2005; 2012–present)
 EZ Shop (2004–present)
 Salamat Dok! (2004–2020)
 Kape't Pandasal (2004–2020)

2005–2009

2005
 HP: To the Highest Level Na! (2005–2007)
 Mapalad Ang Bumabasa (2005–2016)
 News Patrol (2005–present)
 GSIS Members Hour (2005–2007, 2010–2019,2019–present)
 STV: Ang Sabong TV ng Bayan (2005–present)
 Wowowee (2005–2010)
 Day Off (2005–2019)
 Gandang Ricky Reyes: Todo na Toh! (2005–present)
 Ang Pinaka (2005–2020)
 S.O.C.O. (Scene of the Crime Operatives) (2005–2020)
 Adyenda (2005–2017)
 Ang Pagbubunyag (2005–present)
 Balitanghali (2005–present)
 Goin' Bulilit (2005–2019)
 Asenso Pinoy (2005–present)

2006
 Bandila (2006–2020)
 Midnight Player Helps (2006–2020)
 Swak na Swak (2006–present)
 PTV Sports (2006–present)
 Sunday's Best (2006–present
 Square Off (2006–present)
 Mornings @ ANC (2006–2017)
 First Look (2006–2015)

2007
 Boy & Kris (2007–2009)
 Entertainment Live (2007–2012)
 Ful Haus (2007–2009)
 Power To Unite with Elvira (2007–present)
 Umagang Kay Ganda (2007–2020)
 Oras ng Himala (2007–present)
 Spoon: Your Spoonful of Talk! (2007–2015)
 The Healing Eucharist (2007–present)
 Good Morning Kuya (2007–present)
 MOMents (2007–present)
 Born to be Wild (2007–present)
 Sports 37 (2007–2016)

2008
 Hataw Balita News Update (2008–2012)
 Istorya (2008–2020)
 Juicy! (2008–2012)
 Signs & Wonders (2008–present)
 Quiapo TV Mass (2008–present)
 Munting Pangarap (2008–2018)
 The Word Exposed with Luis Antonio Cardinal Tagle (2008–present)
 Landmarks (2008–present)
 Banana Sundae (2008–2020)
 Bread N' Butter (2008–2016)
 Matanglawin (2008–2020)
 Ang Dating Daan: Mandarin Edition (2008–present)
 Bread N' Butter (2008–2016)
 TEN: The Evening News (2008–2010)

2009
 Biz News (2009–2015,2017–2019,2019–2020)
 Spotlight (2009–2018)
 The Doctor Is In (2009–2012, 2014–present)
 It's Showtime (2009–present)
 Failon Ngayon (2009–2020) 
 Tropang Potchi (2009–2015)
 I Survived: Hindi Sumusuko Ang Pinoy (2009–2010)
 The Bottomline with Boy Abunda (2009–2020)

2010s

2010
 Aksyon (2010–2020) 
 Landas ng Buhay (2010–present)
 Stories of Faith (2010–present)
 Astig! (5 minute segment) (2010–2011, 2012–2013)
 Misa Nazareno (2010–present)
 Aksyon Weekend (2010–2012, 2013–2014)
 Party Pilipinas (2010–2013)
 Balitanghali Weekend (2010–2020)
 TV Patrol Weekend (2010–present)
 24 Oras Weekend (2010–present)
 Pinoy M.D. (2010–present)
 AHA! (2010–present)
 Tonight with Arnold Clavio (2010–2020)
 Get It Straight with Daniel Razon (2010–present)
 Polwatch: Political Watch (2010–2016)
 Iba-Balita (2010–2014) 
 Law Profile (2010–2016)
 Manibela (2010–2016)
 Candidly Speaking with Willie (2010–2011)
 Kayo Ang Humatol (2010–present)
 Rotary in Action (2010–2020)
 Easy Lang Yan! (2010–2016)
 Estranghero (2010–2011)
 Kilalanin Natin (2010–2011)
 Pepito Manaloto (2010–present)
 Headstart with Karen Davila (2010–present)
 Face to Face (2010–2013)
 Patrol ng Pilipino (2010–2013)
 Krusada (2010–2013)

2011
 Kerygma TV (2011–2020)
 News Team 13 (2011–2019)
 Tunay Na Buhay (2011–present)
 Gandang Gabi, Vice! (2011–2020)
 T3: Reload (2011–2016)
 Good News Kasama si Vicky Morales (2011–present)
 Brigada (2011–present)
 Soldiers of Christ: Healing on the Air (2011–present)
 Kris TV (2011–2016)
 Power House (2011–2016)
 Balita Pilipinas Ngayon (2011–2019) 
 State of the Nation (2011–present)
 News Light (2011–2019)
 Light Up (2011–present)
 Mata ng Agila (2011–present)
 QUAT: Quick Action Team (2011–2015)
 News TV Live (2011–2021)
 IJuander (2011–present)
 Reel Time (2011–present)
 Wanted sa Radyo (2011–present)
 Net 25 News Update (2011–present)
 Mata ng Agila (2011–present)
 News TV Quick Response Team (2011–2021)
 Newsline World (2011–present)
 Primetime on ANC (2011–2015)
 Pinoy Explorer (2011–2014)
 Wil Time Bigtime (2011–2013)
 PBA on One Sports (2011–present)
 Balita Pilipinas Primetime (2011–2014)

2012
 Hataw Balita Newsbreak (2012–2016)
 iBilib (2012–present)
 Lifegiver (2012–present)
 PTV Sports (2012–present)
 Pisobilites (2012–2019)
 Pulis @ ur Serbis (2012–present)
 Road Trip Refueled (2012–present)
 Solemn Sessions (2012–2018)
 This Is My Story, This Is My Song (2012–2018)
 The Healthy Life (2012–present)
 Sports Desk (2012–present)
 News.PH (2012–2022)
 Taste Buddies (2012–2022)
 Panahon.TV (2012–present)
 MedTalk (2012–present)

2013
 Balitaan (2013–2014)
 Biyahe ni Drew (2013–present)
 Alisto (2013–2021)
 UNTV Cup (2013–present)
 Sa Ganang Mamamayan (2013–present)
 DZRH Network News (2013–present)
 Sunday All Stars (2013–2015)

2014
 The Score (2014–2020)
 Tiny Kitchen (2014–2018)
 IBC NewsBreak (2014–2018)
 Agila Probinsiya (2014–2021)
 Home Sweetie Home (2014–2020)
 The Half Sisters (2014–2016)
 Ismol Family (2014–2016)

2015
 CNN Philippines Network News (2015–2017)
 Hashtag Pinoy (2015–2018)
 JAM (2015–2018)
 River of Worship (2015–2018)
 Why News (2015–present)
 CNN Philippines Newsroom (2015–present)
 CNN Philippines Updates (2015–present)
 Wowowin (2015–2022)
 Real Talk (2015–present)
 Alagang Kapatid (2015–2020)
 Sunday PinaSaya (2015–2019)
 Iskoolmates (2015–present)
 Market Edge (2015–present)
 FPJ's Ang Probinsyano (2015–2022)

2016
 UNTV C-News (2016–present)
 UNTV Newsbreak (2016–present)
 Headline Pilipinas (2016–present)
 Kilos Pronto (2016–2018)
 The Source (2016–present)
 Kids HQ (2016–present)
 Dear Uge (2016–present)
 Balitaan (2016–present)
 New Day (2016–present)
 Magandang Buhay (2016–present)
 The Big Story (2016–present)
 Ika-6 na Utos (2016–2018)

2017
 Sentro Balita (2017–present)
 Ulat Bayan (2017–present)
 Ulat Bayan Weekend (2017–present)
 Daily Info (2017–2020)
 Dobol B TV (2017–present)
 Daig Kayo ng Lola Ko (2017–present)
 News Night (2017–present)
 Early Edition (2017–2020)
 G Diaries (2017–present)
 Stories for the Soul (2017–2019)
 PTV News Headlines (2017–2020)

2018
 Prayerline (2018–present)
 Worship Word & Wonders (2018–present)
 One News Now (2018–present)
 Daddy's Gurl (2018–present)
 The Clash (2018–present)
 Sarap, 'Di Ba? (2018–present)

2019
 The Awesome Life (2019–present)
 Bless Pilipinas (2019–present)
 One Balita Pilipinas (2019–present)
 Tutok 13 (2019–present)
 One Newsroom (2019–present)
 One News World (2019–present)
 Mars Pa More (2019–present)
 The Boobay and Tekla Show (2019–present)
 Magkaagaw (2019–2021)
 Prima Donnas (2019–2022)

2020s

2020
 Bro. Eddie Villanueva Classics (2020–present)
 Make It with You (2020)
 Dobol B sa GMA (2020)
 All-Out Sundays (2020–present)
 Frontline Pilipinas (2020–present)
 Chika, Besh! (2020–2021)
 Bawal na Game Show (2020–2021)
 Fill in the Bank (2020–2021)
 Usapang Real Life (2020–2021)
 Sunday Noontime Live! (2020–2021)
 Sunday 'Kada (2020–2021)
 I Got You (2020–2021)
 News5 Alerts (2020–present)
 Ted Failon at DJ Chacha sa Radyo5 (2020–present)
 Anak ni Waray vs. Anak ni Biday (2020–2021)
 Bilangin ang Bituin sa Langit (2020–2021)
 Descendants of the Sun (2020)
 DepEd TV (2020–2022)
 Lunch Out Loud (2020–present)
 Masked Singer Pilipinas (2020–2021)
 Oh My Dad! (2020–2021)
 Rated Korina (2020–present)
 Counterpoint with Secretary Salvador Panelo (2020–present)
 Love of My Life (2020–2021)
 Happy Time (2020–present)
 Kesayasaya (2020–2021)
 Regional TV Weekend News (2020–2021)
 The Final Word with Rico Hizon (2020–present)
 Paano Kita Mapasasalamatan? (2020–2021)
 Iba 'Yan! (2020–2021)
 PTV News Tonight (2020–present)
 Rise and Shine Pilipinas (2020–present)
 Balitang A2Z (2021–present)
 Frontline sa Umaga (2021–present)
 Frontline Tonight (2021–present)
 The Broken Marriage Vow (2022)
 Marry Me, Marry You (2021–2022)
 La Vida Lena (2021–2022)
 Viral Scandal (2021–2022)
 2 Good 2 Be True (2022)
 Mars Ravelo's Darna: The TV Series (2022–present)
 The Iron Heart (2022–present)

 
 
Lists of Philippine television shows